Woodberry is one of the easternmost suburbs of the City of Maitland in the Hunter Region of New South Wales, Australia. Most of the population lives in residential subdivisions while almost 84% of the suburb's land is rural in nature. Rental accommodation is occupied by 33.33% of the residents.

It lies to the west of the Hunter River,  of which forms the suburb's eastern border, separating it from Heatherbrae and Tomago in the Port Stephens local government area. It is connected by road to the adjoining suburbs of Millers Forest, Beresfield and Tarro. Much of Woodberry is low-lying floodplain and when the Hunter River floods, the roads to Millers Forest and Tarro sometimes become impassable. However, the residential area is elevated and access to Beresfield remains available.

There is a government co-ed primary school called Woodberry Public School on Lawson Avenue in Woodberry.

Notes

References

Suburbs of Maitland, New South Wales